Vila Seca is a Portuguese parish, located in the municipality of Barcelos. The population in 2011 was 1,197, in an area of 4.34 km².

References

Freguesias of Barcelos, Portugal